Thein Htaik is the Union Auditor General of Myanmar, appointed to the post on 7 September 2012. He has served as the Minister for Mines, the Deputy Minister for Transport and was a Colonel in the Myanmar Air Force. He has served as an Inspector General in the Ministry of Defence and is a retired major general in the Myanmar Army.

References

Government ministers of Myanmar
Burmese military personnel
People from Yangon
1952 births
Living people
Defence Services Academy alumni
Burmese generals
Union Solidarity and Development Party politicians
Members of Pyithu Hluttaw